Straight from the Heart may refer to:

Music
 Straight from the Heart (David Houston and Tammy Wynette album), 1971
 Straight from the Heart (Patrice Rushen album), 1982
 Straight from the Heart (Peabo Bryson album), 1984
 Straight from the Heart (The Gap Band album), 1988
 Straight from the Heart: The Very Best of Bonnie Tyler, 1995
 Straight from the Heart (Daryle Singletary album), 2007
 "Straight from the Heart" (The Allman Brothers Band song), 1981
 "Straight from the Heart" (Bryan Adams song), 1983
 "Straight from the Heart" (Doolally song), 1998
 "Straight from the Heart", a song by S Club from the album Seeing Double, 2002

Film
 Straight from the Heart (1935 film), American drama film directed by Scott R. Beal
 Straight from the Heart (1994 film), a documentary film
 Straight from the Heart (1999 film) (Hum Dil De Chuke Sanam), a Bollywood film
 Straight from the Heart (2003 film), a television movie starring Andrew McCarthy

Literature
 Straight from the Hart 2011 autobiography by professional wrestler Bruce Hart
 Straight from the Heart 1986 autobiography by politician Jean Chretien

Other
 Straight from the Heart, a slogan used by 2 Gannett-owned television stations in Knoxville, Tennessee (WBIR-TV 10) and Macon, Georgia (WMAZ-TV 13)

See also
 Straight from My Heart, a 1995 album by Pebbles
 Straight to the Heart (disambiguation)